The Atlantic Tire Championships is a tennis tournament held in Cary, North Carolina, United States since 2015. The event is part of the ATP Challenger Tour and is played on outdoor hard courts.

Past finals

Singles

Doubles

References

External links 

 
ATP Challenger Tour
Hard court tennis tournaments in the United States
Recurring sporting events established in 2015